Dubh Loch is a small upland loch situated within the Balmoral Estate, in Aberdeenshire, Scotland. To the southeast of the loch is the Munro Broad Cairn and to the northwest the ground slopes steeply up to Càrn a' Coire Boidheach and Lochnagar. To the west is Cairn Bannoch and over a high col to the southwest lies Loch Callater.

Creag an Dubh Loch

A wall of granite, Creag an Dubh Loch, rises steeply above the loch on the southeast shading the loch from the sun – hence the name "dark lake".

The loch was a favourite spot for Queen Victoria to visit from her retreat at Glas-allt-Shiel. Once her son Alfred swam out into the loch to capture and kill a wounded stag in the water.

References

Lochs of Aberdeenshire
Freshwater lochs of Scotland